Kimsa Chuta (Aymara kimsa three, chuta end of a terrain, border; sign of the league, also spelled Quinsachota) is a mountain in the Andes of Peru, about  high. It is located in the Puno Region, Lampa Province, Ocuviri District. Kimsa Chuta lies south of Lamparasi.

References

Mountains of Peru
Mountains of Puno Region